Melanothrix fumosa is a moth in the family Eupterotidae. It was described by Swinhoe in 1905. It is found on Borneo.

Adult males have a complete white bar on the forewings, while females have an extensive yellow area on each wing distally.

References

Moths described in 1905
Eupterotinae